Gyugy is a village in Somogy county, Hungary.

The settlement is part of the Balatonboglár wine region.

Sightseeings 
Beautiful memorial of the village is the Árpád age church on the southern hills. It was renewed after an archaeological and architectural investigation in the last years. This church is a gem of the Somogy-side, southern Balaton side.

External links
 Street map (Hungarian)

References 

Populated places in Somogy County
Romanesque architecture in Hungary